Karangalan Village is a residential area located at Barangays Manggahan and Dela Paz in Pasig.

References

Pasig